Her Redemption is a 1924 British silent crime film directed by Bertram Phillips and starring Queenie Thomas, John Stuart and Cecil Humphreys.

Cast
 Queenie Thomas as Olivia / Sylvia Meredith  
 John Stuart as Jack Latimer  
 Cecil Humphreys as Hubert Steele  
 Juliette Compton as Liana Vandry  
 Frank Stanmore as Barney  
 Arthur Cleave as Percy  
 Wyndham Guise as Seth Howard

References

Bibliography
 Goble, Alan. The Complete Index to Literary Sources in Film. Walter de Gruyter, 1999.

External links

1924 films
1924 crime films
British crime films
British silent feature films
Films directed by Bertram Phillips
Films set in England
British films based on plays
British black-and-white films
1920s English-language films
1920s British films